

Vandino (sometimes Vadino or Guido) and Ugolino Vivaldi (sometimes Ugolino de Vivaldo) (fl. 1291) were two brothers and Genoese explorers and merchants who are best known for their attempted voyage from Europe to India via Africa. They set sail west from the Mediterranean into the Atlantic and were never heard from again.

History
Vandino and Ugolino Vivaldi were connected with the first known expedition in search of an ocean way from Europe to India (Cape Route). Ugolino, with his brother Guido or Vandino Vivaldo, was in command of this expedition of two galleys, which he had organized in conjunction with Tedisio Doria, and which left Genoa in May 1291 with the purpose of going to India "by the Ocean Sea" and bringing back useful things for trade. Planned primarily for commerce, the enterprise also aimed at proselytism. Two Franciscan friars accompanied Ugolino. The galleys were well armed and sailed down the Morocco coast to a place called Gozora (Cape Nun), in 28º 47' N., after which nothing more was heard of them. The expedition of the Vivaldi brothers was one of the first recorded voyages that sailed out from the Mediterranean into the Atlantic since the Fall of the Western Roman Empire in the 5th century AD.

It is believed that when Lancelotto Malocello set sail from Genoa in 1312, he did so in order to search for Vandino and Ugolino Vivaldi. Malocello ended up remaining on the island that is named for him, Lanzarote, one of the Canary Islands, for more than two decades.

Early in the 14th century, Sorleone de Vivaldo, son of Ugolino, undertook a series of distant wanderings in search of his father and uncle, and even reached, it is said, Mogadishu on the Somali coast, but was prevented by the King of Mogadishu from going to Aksum, because the road to the collapsed ancient kingdom was no longer secure. In 1455 another Genoese seaman, Antoniotto Uso di Mare, sailing with Cadamosto in the service of Prince Henry the Navigator of Portugal, claimed to have met, near the mouth of the Gambia, with the last descendant of the survivors of the Vivaldo expedition. The two galleys, he was told, had sailed to the Sea of Guinea; in that sea one was stranded, but the other passed on to a place on the coast of Aethiopia (here meaning Black Africa) — Mena or Amenuan, near the Gihon (here probably meaning the Senegal River) where the Genoese were seized and held in close captivity.

Sources 
The principal documentary source is the Genoese annals of Jacopo Doria, presented to the city of Genoa in 1294.  Under the entry of the year 1291, Doria writes the following: 

In Galvano Fiamma's book, Galvano claims the Vivaldi expedition reached Ethiopia, from where the survivors gave up returning to their city.

Geography 
Jean Gimpel suggests that the two Franciscan friars who accompanied the Vivaldi brothers may have read the  written by their fellow Franciscan, Roger Bacon, in which Bacon suggested that the distance separating Spain and India was not great, a theory that was later repeated by Pierre d'Ailly and tested by Christopher Columbus.

It is uncertain how far the Vivaldi brothers reached. The Vivaldi brothers may have seen or landed on the Canary Islands. "Gozora" is a name found in some Medieval charts for Cape Non, which lies before the Canary Islands (e.g.  in the maps of Giovanni da Carignano, early 1300s, and the Pizzigani brothers, 1367). The name of the ship  may be the source for the Canary Island of Alegranza, and has led to the supposition that the brothers landed there (or that at least one of the ships capsized there).

There are two passages relating to the Vivaldi brothers. "They told me in this city of Graciona that the Genoese who escaped the galley that was wrecked at Amenuan were brought (betrayed?) here, but it was never known what became of the other galley which escaped.".

The locations of these kingdoms have been the subject of speculation. However, the narrator's geographical references (e.g. to the Senegal-Niger River, the gold trade, the Mali Empire, even the Gulf of Guinea) suggest that Abdelsalib and Magdasor were in non-Muslim sub-Saharan West Africa. The localization of "Amenuan", the place where the first galley capsized, is suggestive of the Senegambia region. If there is a grain of truth in any of this, it would not stretch credulity to imagine that the Vivaldis got as far as Senegal, and that their adventures ended there.

A century later, in late 1455, Antoniotto Usodimare, a Genoese navigator in the service of Prince Henry the Navigator, claims rather improbably in a letter that while traveling up the Gambia River in West Africa, he came across a man who spoke the Genoese dialect and claimed to be the last descendant of the survivors of the Vivaldi expedition. (Usodimare's travelling companion, Alvise Cadamosto, mentions no such meeting in his memoirs.) Usodimare gives more details of the Vivaldi expedition in another document in the Genoese archives:

Gion is the name of Biblical Gihon river that stems from the Garden of Eden and flows through Ethiopia. In this instance, it may be a reference to the Senegal River.

Viera y Clavijo also mentions the fact that Petrarch states that it was a local tradition that the Vivaldis did indeed reach the Canary Islands. Neither Justiniani nor Petrarch knew of the expedition's fate. Papiro Masson in his Anales writes that the brothers were the first modern discoverers of the Canary Islands.

The Vivaldi brothers subsequently became the subjects of legends that featured them circumnavigating Africa before being captured by the mythical Christian king Prester John. The Vivaldis' voyage may have inspired Dante’s Canto 26 of the Inferno about Ulysses’ last voyage, which ends in failure in the Southern Hemisphere. According to Henry F. Cary, Ulysses' fate was inspired "...partly from the fate which there was reason to suppose had befallen some adventurous explorers of the Atlantic ocean."

See also
List of people who disappeared mysteriously at sea

Notes

References
 (Anonymous Friar) (c.1350–85) El Libro del Conosçimiento de todos los rregnos et tierras e señoríos que son por el mundo et de las señales et armas que han cada tierra y señorío por sy y de los reyes y señores que los proueen, escrito por un franciscano español á mediados del siglo XIV (Marcos Jiménez de la Espada ed., 1877, Madrid: Impr. de T. Fortanet online)
 José Juan Acosta; Félix Rodríguez Lorenzo; Carmelo L. Quintero Padrón, Conquista y Colonización (Santa Cruz de Tenerife: Centro de la Cultura Popular Canaria, 1988), p. 23.
 José de Viera y Clavijo, Historia de Canarias: Tomo I (Madrid: Biblioteca Básica Canaria, 1991), p. 107 (XX. Los Genoveses).
 D'Avezac, M.A.P. Marquis (1845) Notice des découvertes faites au môyen-age dans l'Océan Atlantique, antérieurement aux grandes explorations portugaises du quinzième siècle, Paris: Fain et Thunot online
 D'Avezac, M.A.P. Marquis (1859) L'expédition génoise des fréres Vivaldi à la découverte de la route maritime des Indes Orientales au XIIIe siècle, Paris: Bertrand online
 Rogers, F.M. (1955) "The Vivaldi Expedition", Annual Reports of the Dante Society, No. 73, p. 31-45.

13th-century explorers
13th-century deaths
13th-century Genoese people
Explorers from the Republic of Genoa
History of the Canary Islands
Lost explorers
People lost at sea
Sibling duos
Year of birth unknown